KRLC (1350 AM) is a radio station broadcasting a Country music format. The station is licensed to Lewiston, Idaho, and serves the Clarkston, Washington,–Lewiston area. The station is currently owned by Lee and Angela McVey, through licensee McVey Entertainment Group, LLC.

History
KRLC began broadcasting in late 1934 or early 1935. It was licensed to H.E. Studebaker.

References

External links

FCC history cards for KRLC
 

Country radio stations in the United States
RLC
Radio stations established in 1935
1935 establishments in Idaho